Giovanni Ambrogio Figino (1548/1551 – 11 October 1608) was an Italian Renaissance painter from Milan.

Biography
An important representative of the Lombard school of painting, he had been taught by Gian Paolo Lomazzo. Best known as a draftsman, he was also a skilled portrait painter. Among the few portraits that can be traced back to Figino, the portrait of Field Marshal Lucio Foppa is one of the best known.

On January 25, 2001, his Portrait of Giovanni Angelo was auctioned at Sotheby's for US$ $1,435,750; after a high estimate of US$180,000 

The organ shutters for the Cathedral of Milan were painted after 1590 by Ambrogio, Camillo Procaccini, and Giuseppe Meda, depicting the Passage of the Red Sea and the Ascencion of Christ. In the Castello Sforcesco there is a painting of his of Saint Ambrose expelling the Arians. A still life painting, a thematic uncommon among Italians of his day, of peaches is attributed to him
He also painted in Milan an Immaculate conception for Sant'Antonio, and a Virgin with child, saints, and donors now at Brera Gallery.

Works 
The majority of Figino's works are drawings. These amount to over 430 known drawings. His known works include the following.

 ritratto di Angelo Dannona
 ritratto di S. Carlo, Milano, Pinacoteca Ambrosiana, ante 1584
 ritratto del Maresciallo di campo Lucio Foppa, Milano, Pinacoteca di Brera, 1585 c.
 Piatto metallico con pesche e foglie di vite, Olio su tavola, 21 x 29, 4 cm, Collezione privata
 Cristo e il fariseo, sagrestia del duomo di Monza
 Agonia nell'orto, Santa Maria della Passione, Milano
 Giove, Giunone e Io, Pavia Civic Museums, 1599
 Incoronazione della Vergine, Ss. Pietro, Paolo, Maria Maddalena e Marta, ciclo di dipinti per la chiesa di San Fedele, Milano 
 Madonna del serpe, chiesa di Sant'Antonio Abate a Milano
 S. Paolo e S. Matteo chiesa di San Raffaele, Milano 
 Madonna col Bambino e i ss. Giovanni Evangelista e Michele Arcangelo, pala per la cappella del Collegio dei dottori di Milano, Pinacoteca di Brera
 S. Ambrogio che sconfigge gli ariani per la cappella del Collegio dei mercanti, Pinacoteca del Castello Sforzesco
 S. Giorgio, santuario dell'Addolorata di Rho
 Natività di Cristo, Passaggio degli Ebrei attraverso il mar Rosso, Ascensione (Perduta), ante d'organo del duomo di Milano, eseguite tra il 1590 e il 1595
 Natività di Maria, chiesa di Sant'Antonio Abate a Milano
 Incoronazione della Vergine, affresco Nella volta del presbiterio di San Vittore al Corpo
 Fatti della vita di s. Benedetto, Dio Padre, Angeli in volo, Putti alati e Angeli musici, ala sinistra del transetto di San Vittore al Corpo
 Cristo alla colonna, Museo civico di Busto Arsizio

Notes

References

External links
Description of his best known works.
The Annunciation, a drawing by Figino.
Brief bio of  Figino from Web Gallery of Art
Painters of reality: the legacy of Leonardo and Caravaggio in Lombardy, an exhibition catalog from The Metropolitan Museum of Art (fully available online as PDF), which contains material on Figino (see index)

16th-century births
1608 deaths
16th-century Italian painters
Italian male painters
17th-century Italian painters
Painters from Milan
Renaissance painters